The 1908 Texas gubernatorial election was held to elect the Governor of Texas. Governor Thomas Mitchell Campbell was re-elected to a second term in office.

Campbell defeated State Representative Robert R. Williams in the Democratic primary by a wide margin, which was tantamount to victory in the general election.

Democratic primary

Candidates
Thomas Mitchell Campbell, incumbent Governor
Robert R. Williams, State Representative from Hopkins County

Results

General election

Candidates
Thomas Mitchell Campbell, incumbent Governor (Democratic)
W. B. Cook (Socialist Labor)
Ephraim Charles Heath, former State Representative from Rockwall County and nominee in 1890 (Prohibition)
Charles L. Martin (Independence)
John C. Rhodes (Socialist)
John Nicholas Simpson, banker and cattleman (Republican)

Charles L. Martin was a late substitute as the Independence candidate, so his name did not appear on the ballot.

Results

References

1908
Texas
1908 Texas elections